The New Jersey Association of Independent Schools (NJAIS) serves independent elementary and secondary schools throughout the state of New Jersey. The Association consists of 70 member schools with a total enrollment of approximately 26,000 students. The New Jersey Association of Independent Schools is the representative organization of independent schools throughout the state of New Jersey. It promotes and supports educational, ethical, and professional excellence in member schools, and works to protect their independence through advocacy at the local, state, and federal levels.

The NJAIS is a member of the National Association of Independent Schools.

Member Middle/High Schools 

 Academy of the Holy Angels, Demarest (Angels)
 The Craig School, Mountain Lakes (Badgers)
 Delbarton School, Morristown (Green Wave)
 Doane Academy, Burlington (Spartans)
 Dwight-Englewood School, Englewood (Bulldogs)
 Gill St. Bernard's School, Gladstone (Knights)
 Golda Och Academy, West Orange (Road Runners)
 The Hudson School, Hoboken (Hornets)
 Hun School of Princeton, Princeton (Raiders)
 Kent Place School, Summit (Dragons)
 Lacordaire Academy, Upper Montclair (Lions)
 The Lewis School of Princeton, Princeton
 Montclair Kimberley Academy, Montclair (Cougars)
 Moorestown Friends School, Moorestown (Foxes)
 Morristown-Beard School, Morristown (Crimson)
 Newark Academy, Livingston (Minutemen)
 Newgrange School, Hamilton
 Noor-Ul-Iman School, South Brunswick
 Oak Knoll School of the Holy Child, Summit (Royals)
 Oratory Preparatory School, Summit (Rams)
 The Pennington School, Pennington (Red Hawks)
 Pingry School, Basking Ridge (Big Blue)
 Pioneer Academy, Wayne
 Princeton Day School, Princeton (Panthers)
 Ranney School, Tinton Falls (Panthers)
 Rutgers Preparatory School, Somerset (Argonauts)
 Saddle River Day School, Saddle River (Rebels)
 St. Benedict's Preparatory School, Newark (Gray Bees)
 Saint Dominic Academy, Jersey City (Blue Devils)
 Sinai Christian Academy, Linden (Warriors)
 Stuart Country Day School of the Sacred Heart, Princeton (Tartans)
 Villa Victoria Academy, Ewing (Yellow Jackets)
 Villa Walsh Academy, Morristown (Vikings)
 Wardlaw-Hartridge School, Edison (Rams)

Member High Schools 

 Academy of Saint Elizabeth, Convent Station (Panthers)
 Blair Academy, Blairstown (Buccaneers)
 Community High School, Teaneck (Eagles)
 Elite Preparatory Academy, Hopatcong
 Immaculate Heart Academy, Washington (Blue Eagles)
 Lawrenceville School, Lawrenceville (Big Red)
 Mount Saint Dominic Academy, Caldwell (Lady Lions)
 Mount St. Mary Academy, Watchung (Lions)
 Our Lady of Mercy Academy, Franklin Township (Villagers)
 The Patrick School, Hillside (Fighting Celtics)
 Peddie School, Hightstown (Falcons)
 St. Augustine Preparatory School, Richland (Hermits)
 St. Joseph High School, Metuchen (Falcons)
 St. Peter's Preparatory School, Jersey City (Marauders)
 Trinity Hall, Tinton Falls (Monarchs)

Member Middle Schools 

 All Saints Episcopal Day School, Hoboken
 Ben Porat Yosef, Paramus
 Chapin School, Princeton
 Chatham Day School, Chatham
 Christina Seix Academy, Trenton
 Community Lower School, Teaneck
 Edgarton Christian Academy, Newfield
 Elisabeth Morrow School, Englewood
 Far Brook School, Short Hills
 Far Hills Country Day School, Far Hills
 French-American School of Princeton, Princeton
 Friends School Mullica Hill, Mullica Hill
 Gottesman RTW Academy, Randolph
 Haddonfield Friends School, Haddonfield
 Hebrew Academy, Marlboro
 Hovnanian School, New Milford
 Joseph Kushner Hebrew Academy, Livingston
 Kellman Brown Academy, Voorhees
 Laurel School of Princeton, Pennington
 Montclair Cooperative School, Montclair
 Mustard Seed School, Hoboken
 Newark Boys Chorus School, Newark
 Oak Hill Academy, Lincroft
 The Peck School, Morristown
 Princeton Academy of the Sacred Heart, Princeton
 Princeton Friends School, Princeton
 Princeton Montessori School, Princeton
 The Red Oaks School, Morristown
 Rumson Country Day School, Rumson
 Sisters Academy of New Jersey, Asbury Park
 Solomon Schechter Day School of Bergen County, New Milford
 Stevens Cooperative School, Hoboken/Jersey City
 The Village School, Waldwick
 Waldorf School of Princeton, Princeton
 Westfield Friends School, Cinnaminson
 Willow School, Gladstone
 The Winston School, Short Hills

References

External links
 New Jersey Association of Independent Schools website

 
United States schools associations
Independent